The Norwegian Army had in 2002 officially 59 bugle calls (unofficially 60 if one includes the Valdres Battalion call, which is the baseline tune for the Valdres March). These are divided into two groups; 

A) “Orders” – that is a signal for an action
B) “Unit” – which identifies a unit (usually battalion, regiment, brigade, division)

History of the bugle calls 
Bugle calls have in history been used to relay orders over distances or to large formation of troops. 

Some of the traditions of the Norwegian Armed Forces have their roots from either the personal union with Denmark or Sweden. This is also true when it comes to bugle calls, E.g. the bugle call for "Troop" is in Norway and Sweden identical. But due to Norwegian history and historical trade routes with the United Kingdom and The Netherlands some bugle calls have been borrowed and incorporated into the Norwegian Armed Forces, e.g. the bugle call "Parade" is identical to the same bugle call in Sweden, and identical "to the colours" in the United States. 

With the rise of Norwegian nationalism from 1814 to 1905 composers like Johannes Hanssen wrote new bugle calls based on old Norwegian folk tunes.
One such example is the Unit call for the Valdres Battalion, which is also the baseline tune for the more known Valdres March.

Today, the bugle calls are primarily used for ceremonial functions such as flag hoist/lowering, change of commands, military burials, religious service, etc.

Bugle calls 
The Norwegian Army maintains these bugle calls as represented below with their respective meanings, i.e., “orders”:

Revelje - Revellie 
This bugle call is used to awaken the troops and prepare for morning inspection or roll call.

Spisesignal - Mess call 
This bugle call gives notice that a meal is ready to be served. 

Oppstilling - Formation – First call 
This bugle call orders the troops to assemble in formations.

Flaggappell – To the colors 
This bugle call gives notice to all personnel that the national flag (Flag of Norway) is being hoisted/lowered, and that they are therefore to stand at attention and render honours.

Tropp – Company 
This bugle call orders troop formations to take up positions, or that the  battalion/regimental colours / Flag of Norway is to be brought to the fore of the troop formation for parade.

Vaktombytte – Changing of the guard 
This bugle call is sounded during a changing-of-the-guard ceremony to signal that the new guard has taken up its post and the old guard has been dismissed. 

Tappenstrek – Taps 
This bugle call orders all activity to cease for the night. Historically it is linked to the Dutch words tap den doe that is translated as “plug the keg”; meaning that the soldiers were to be served no further alcohol, and were to return to base.

Rosignal – Tattoo 
Literally "call for quiet", this bugle call orders all non-essential lights out. 

Appell – Flourishes 
This bugle call is to announce the entrance of high-ranking officers from the rank of brigadier up to full general. A flourish is repeated according to the rank number of stars: 
(1- Brigadier, 2 - Major General, 3 -Lieutenant General, 4 – General).

Parademarsj – Parade march 
This bugle call gives notice either to the entrance/attendance of His Majesty the King or to alert soldiers to give their attention and honour the colours as they are presented formally in slow march at the head of a formation.

Bønn – Church call – Remembrance 
This bugle call orders the stay of all services for prayer or religious services, or is used to mark an act of remembrance in the same way as “taps” in the USA or “Last post” in the UK and Commonwealth. It can be played bugle(s)-only or in combination with drum(s).

Fremad Marsj – Forward March 
This bugle call orders the unit to advance at normal pace.

Holdt – Halt 
This bugle call orders the unit to halt.

Innrykkning – Charge 
This bugle call orders the unit to charge a position and take it.

Alarm – This bugle call indicates that the unit is to stand-to.

Flyalarm – Air-raid alarm 
This bugle call signals that an air raid is imminent.

Panseralarm – Tank/panzer alarm 
This bugle call alerts an attack by armored units.

Ild – Commence firing 
This bugle call orders units to open fire.

References 

Norwegian Army
Bugle calls

de:Hornsignal
el:Σάλπισμα
fr:Sonnerie militaire